The first Malta captain was Salvinu Schembri who captained Malta in their first official match against Austria on 24 February 1957. Since its first competitive match, more than 300 players have made at least one international appearance for the team. Of them, 32 have served as captain of the national team. The record holder is currently Michael Mifsud with 48.

List of captains 

Appearances and goals are composed of FIFA World Cup, UEFA European Championship matches and each competition's required qualification matches, as well as numerous international friendly tournaments and matches. Players are initially listed by number of matches captained, followed by number of international caps attained. If the number of matches captained and the number of caps earned are equal, then the player who captained the national team first is listed first. Statistics correct as of 10 September 2018.

See also 
 List of Malta international footballers

References 

Captains
Malta
Association football player non-biographical articles